Fightin' Mad is a 1921 American silent Western comedy film directed by Joseph Franz and starring William Desmond, Virginia Brown Faire and Rosemary Theby.

Cast
 William Desmond as Bud McGraw
 Virginia Brown Faire as Peggy Hughes
 Doris Pawn as Eileen Graham
 Rosemary Theby as Nita de Garma
 Joseph J. Dowling as James McGraw
 W.E. Lawrence as Francisco Lazaro
 Emmett King as Howard Graham 
 Jack Richardson as Amos Rawson
 William J. Dyer as Obadiah Brennan
 Bert Lindley as Micah Higgins
 George Stanley as Colonel Gates
 Vernon Snively as Captain Farley

References

Bibliography
 Connelly, Robert B. The Silents: Silent Feature Films, 1910-36, Volume 40, Issue 2. December Press, 1998.
 Munden, Kenneth White. The American Film Institute Catalog of Motion Pictures Produced in the United States, Part 1. University of California Press, 1997.

External links
 

1921 films
1921 comedy films
1921 Western (genre) films
1920s English-language films
American silent feature films
1920s Western (genre) comedy films
American black-and-white films
Films directed by Joseph Franz
Metro Pictures films
1920s American films
Silent American Western (genre) comedy films